Perigenes is a genus of dirt-colored seed bugs in the family Rhyparochromidae. There are at least three described species in Perigenes.

Species
These three species belong to the genus Perigenes:
 Perigenes constrictus (Say, 1831)
 Perigenes dispositus Distant, 1893
 Perigenes similis Barber, 1906

References

External links

 

Rhyparochromidae
Articles created by Qbugbot